Rea Hraski (born 22 March 1992) is a Croatian alpine skier. She represented Croatia at the 2007 Winter Deaflympics, the 2015 Winter Deaflympics and the 2019 Winter Deaflympics.

Rea claimed the bronze medal in the women's slalom event during the 2007 Winter Deaflympics, where she was placed at third position just behind Czech Republic's leading alpine skier Tereza Kmochová. In 2013, she was nominated for the ICSD Deaf Sportswoman of the Year award.

In 2019, she won the bronze medal in both the women's downhill and women's Super-G events at the 2019 Winter Deaflympics.

References 

1992 births
Living people
Croatian female alpine skiers
Deaf skiers
Croatian deaf people
Alpine skiers at the 2007 Winter Deaflympics
Alpine skiers at the 2015 Winter Deaflympics
Alpine skiers at the 2019 Winter Deaflympics
Medalists at the 2007 Winter Deaflympics
Medalists at the 2019 Winter Deaflympics
21st-century Croatian women